Michael P. Zuke (born 16 April 1954) is a Canadian former professional ice hockey centreman who played eight seasons in the NHL between 1978 and 1986.

Zuke was drafted 79th overall by the St. Louis Blues in the 1974 NHL amateur draft. He played 455 career NHL games, scoring 86 goals and 196 assists for 282 points. Zuke's father was a local mail carrier and hockey coach who helped produce great NHL players (e.g., Ron Francis).

Zuke also played NCAA hockey for Michigan Tech, and is the all-time scoring leader with 133 goals and 177 assist for at total of 310 points in 163 games played in his four years there. Zuke helped the Huskies win the national championship in 1975. He leads the all-time list by an impressive 97 points. He also holds the all-time high for goals and assists respectively.

Career statistics

Regular season and playoffs

Personal life 

Zuke presently owns and operates Mike Zuke Enterprises in St. Louis, an apparel, screen printing and embroidery business.

Awards and honours

References

External links
Mike Zuke Enterprises website

1954 births
Living people
AHCA Division I men's ice hockey All-Americans
Canadian ice hockey centres
Edmonton Oilers (WHA) players
Hartford Whalers players
Ice hockey people from Ontario
Indianapolis Racers draft picks
Indianapolis Racers players
Michigan Tech Huskies men's ice hockey players
St. Louis Blues draft picks
St. Louis Blues players
Salt Lake Golden Eagles (CHL) players
Sportspeople from Sault Ste. Marie, Ontario
Canadian expatriate ice hockey players in the United States
St. Louis Blues announcers
NCAA men's ice hockey national champions